Emiliano Melis (born 3 March 1979) is a retired Italian football striker.

References

1979 births
Living people
Italian footballers
Cagliari Calcio players
U.S. Alessandria Calcio 1912 players
S.E.F. Torres 1903 players
U.S. Pistoiese 1921 players
F.C. Grosseto S.S.D. players
Benevento Calcio players
Arzachena Academy Costa Smeralda players
U.S. Vibonese Calcio players
Association football forwards
Serie A players
Serie B players